WJJM-FM (94.3 MHz) is a radio station broadcasting a country music format. Licensed to Lewisburg, Tennessee, United States, the station is currently owned by WJJM, Inc. and features programming from Fox News Radio and numerous syndicators; local programming includes various full-service features such as local news updates, tradio services (unusually two-tiered, with one program, "Trading Post," offering free ads and another, "Bargain Finders," offering low-cost paid listings), local church services and extensive high school sports coverage.

References

External links
 
 

Country radio stations in the United States
JJM-FM
Marshall County, Tennessee